Lešani is a village in the municipality of Debarca, North Macedonia. It used to be part of the former municipality of Belčišta.

Demographics
According to the 2002 census, the village had a total of 484 inhabitants. Ethnic groups in the village include:

Macedonians 483
Serbs 1

References

Villages in Debarca Municipality